is a Japanese football player, currently playing for JPV Marikina.

Kozawa played for FC Tokyo in the J1 League in 2006–2007, and Pattaya United in the Thai Premier League between 2008 and 2010.

Club statistics

References

External links

1988 births
Living people
Association football people from Aichi Prefecture
Japanese footballers
J1 League players
Japan Football League players
FC Tokyo players
Gainare Tottori players
Blaublitz Akita players
Ryuki Kozawa
Ryuki Kozawa
FB Gulbene players
I-League players
Mumbai FC players
Japanese expatriate footballers
Japanese expatriate sportspeople in Thailand
Expatriate footballers in Thailand
Japanese expatriate sportspeople in Latvia
Expatriate footballers in Latvia
Expatriate footballers in Poland
Japanese expatriate sportspeople in India
Expatriate footballers in India
Association football forwards